Nicolasa Escamilla known as La Pajuelera (fl. 1747 – fl. 1776) was a Spanish bullfighter. 

She was one of the most famous bullfighters of her sex. She was the subject of an illustration by Francisco Goya and a poem by Fernando Soteras.

References 

18th-century births
18th-century deaths
18th-century Spanish women
18th-century sportswomen
Spanish bullfighters
Female bullfighters